Unchained is a 2012 studio album by Molly Sandén.

Track listing

Charts

References

2012 albums
Molly Sandén albums